Tony Piroski (born June 12, 1954) is a Canadian retired professional ice hockey goaltender.

Career
Piroski was born in Windsor, Ontario. He played the most seasons for the Toledo Goaldiggers of the International Hockey League. He later coached Toledo for the 1984–85, recording a 32–42–5–3 record. In 2001, Piroski joined began coaching the Essex 73's. In his nine seasons with the club, they won seven league championships, and three Provincial titles, recording a record of 286–47. On Tuesday, March 16, 2010, Piroski was named head coach of the Leamington Flyers Jr. B Hockey Club. In his First season with the Flyers, they won 26 games (26–21–0–4) compared to seven wins (7–38–0–5) the season before, a 19-win improvement under Piroski in his first season.

In Piroski's fourth season with the Leamington Flyers he guided the team to a first place finish with a record of 37–10–2 and would lead the 2013–14 Leamington Flyers to their first-ever Western Conference Championship.

In 2018, Flyers owner Abe Fehr sold the team to five local businessmen and Piroski decided to step down as Head Coach of the Leamington Flyers. In Piroski's eight seasons as Head Coach of the Flyers, he had a regular season record of 262 wins, 108 losses, 6 ties and 25 overtime losses. Leamington won two Western Conference Championships along with four straight League Finals appearances.

Coaching career

References

1954 births
Canadian ice hockey coaches
Canadian ice hockey goaltenders
Ice hockey people from Ontario
International Hockey League (1945–2001) head coaches
Kalamazoo Wings (1974–2000) players
Living people
Port Huron Flags (IHL) players
Sportspeople from Windsor, Ontario
Toledo Goaldiggers players